Gulenia borealis is a species of sea slug, an aeolid nudibranch, a marine gastropod mollusk in the family Flabellinidae.

Distribution

This species was described from Norway. It has been found in deeper waters of the North Sea associated with the sea pen Funiculina quadrangularis.

References

Flabellinidae
Gastropods described in 1922